The 2003 Maine Black Bears football team was an American football team that represented the University of Maine as a member of the Atlantic 10 Conference during the 2003 NCAA Division I-AA football season. In their 11th season under head coach Jack Cosgrove, the Black Bears compiled a 7–5 record (5–4 against conference opponents) and tied for fifth place in the conference. Dennis Dottin-Carter and Michael Zyskowski were the team captains.

Schedule

References

Maine
Maine Black Bears football seasons
Maine Black Bears football